The Le Grand Bridge was a bridge north of Le Grand, Iowa, United States. Since Abbott Avenue is the border between Marshall and Tama counties, the bridge is in two counties lengthwise. Many bridges span from one county to another, but few are lengthwise split. It necessitated a joint session of the two counties' Boards of Supervisors on June 29, 1896, to approve the project. The pinned Pratt through truss bridge was built in 1896 by the Marshalltown Bridge and Iron Works for $3,548. It was listed on the National Register of Historic Places in 1998. The bridge collapsed in the Iowa flood of 2008.

See also
 Le Grand Bridge (1914), over the same Iowa River backwater, wholly in Marshall County

References

Bridges completed in 1896
Bridges in Marshall County, Iowa
Bridges in Tama County, Iowa
Road bridges on the National Register of Historic Places in Iowa
National Register of Historic Places in Tama County, Iowa
National Register of Historic Places in Marshall County, Iowa
Truss bridges in Iowa
Pratt truss bridges in the United States